During 2010 the Australian radio station ABC Classic FM held a Classic 100 Ten Years On countdown. The survey recreated the Classic 100 Original countdown held in 2001.

Voting for the countdown was held between 11 September 2010 and 1 October 2010, with each listener being permitted to vote for up to 10 works. The broadcasting of the results of the countdown began on 30 October 2010 and concluded on 7 November 2010.

Countdown results
The results of countdown are as follows:

* The following six songs were broadcast as No. 98 in the countdown:
Cäcilie – Opus 27 No. 2 (1894).
Ruhe, meine Seele! – Opus 27 No. 1 (1894).
Morgen! – Opus 27 No. 4 (1894).
Meinem Kinde – Opus 37 No. 3 (1898).
Wiegenlied – Opus 41 No. 1 (1899).
Zueignung – Opus 10 No. 1 (1885).

Programming
For more information about the works broadcast (including performers and recording details), see ABC Classic FM's programming notes:
Day 1: Numbers 100 to 90
Day 2: Numbers 89 to 79
Day 3: Numbers 78 to 68
Day 4: Numbers 67 to 52
Day 5: Numbers 51 to 40
Day 6: Numbers 39 to 24
Day 7: Numbers 23 to 12
Day 8: Numbers 11 to 4
Day 9: Numbers 3 to 1

By Composer
The following 48 composers were featured in the countdown:

* Note that the number of works above totals to two more than the number of works in the countdown due to:
Albinoni and Giazotto being entered separately for the same work.
Mussorgsky and Ravel being entered separately for the same work.

Original Classic 100 survey
The Original Classic 100 countdown was held in 2001. The following 28 works from the original did not appear in the 2010 countdown.

The following composers included in the 2001 countdown did not appear in the 2010 countdown:
Caccini (or rather Vladimir Vavilov)
Gluck
Litolff
Verdi
Wagner

See also
Classic 100 Countdowns

References

External links
Official ABC Classic FM Classic 100—Ten Years On site

Classic 100 Countdowns (ABC)
2010 in Australian music